Saint-André-en-Morvan is a commune in the Nièvre department in central France.

See also
Communes of the Nièvre department
Parc naturel régional du Morvan

References

Communes of Nièvre